The term unicycle is often used in robotics and control theory to mean a generalised cart or car moving in a two-dimensional world; these are also often called "unicycle-like" or "unicycle-type" vehicles. This usage is distinct from the literal sense of "one wheeled robot bicycle".

These theoretical vehicles are typically shown as having two parallel driven wheels, one mounted on each side of their centre, and (presumably) some sort of offset castor to maintain balance; although in general they could be any vehicle capable of simultaneous arbitrary rotation and translation. An alternative realization uses a single driven wheel with steering, and a pair of idler wheels to give balance and allow a steering torque to be applied.

A physically realisable unicycle, in this sense, is a nonholonomic system.  This is a system in which a return to the original internal (wheel) configuration does not guarantee return to the original system (unicycle) position.  In other words, the system outcome is path-dependent.

See also
 Inverted pendulum
 Turtle robot
 Braitenberg vehicles

Robot control
Control theory